İstanbul Bank was a former Turkish bank. It was founded in 1953 with a founding capital of TL 30,000,000. It had the shares of Erdemir and Güneş Sigorta (insurance company). Between 1979-1983 it was the sponsor of Yenişehir S.K. (sports club).
It was merged to Ziraat Bank on 24 November 1983.

References

Banks established in 1953
Banks disestablished in 1983
Banks of Turkey
Turkish brands
Defunct banks of Turkey